Tourism in Australia is an important part of the Australian economy, and comprises domestic and international visitors. Australia is the fortieth most visited country in the world according to the World Tourism Organization. In the financial year 2018/19, tourism was Australia's fourth-largest export and over the previous decade was growing faster than national GDP growth. At the time it represented 3.1% of Australia's GDP contributing A$60.8 billion to the national economy.

In the calendar year up to December 2019, there were 8.7 million international visitors in Australia. Tourism employed 666,000 people in Australia in 2018–19, 1 in 21 jobs across the workforce. About 48% of people employed in tourism were full-time and 54% female  Tourism also contributed 8.2% of Australia's total export earnings in 2018–19.

Popular Australian destinations include the coastal cities of Sydney, Brisbane and Melbourne, as well as other high-profile destinations including regional Queensland, the Gold Coast and the Great Barrier Reef, the world's largest reef. Other popular locations include Uluru, the Australian outback and the Tasmanian wilderness. The unique Australian wildlife is also another significant point of interest in the country's tourism.

Trends
Despite the global economic challenges and natural disasters in 2010–2011, Australia's tourism growth was supported by increased consumption (up 4.4% over the last few years, largely due to an increase in the number of international visitors). On the back of a strong Australian dollar, 2010–11 also saw a record 7.4 million short-term resident departures from Australia, an increase of 9.9% from 2009–10. Consumption by domestic tourists grew at less than half the pace of international tourists in 2010–11 (up 2.1% compared to 4.4%).

The Australian Government released the 2020 Tourism Industry Potential on 15 November 2010, which estimated the Australian tourism industry to be worth up to $140 billion in overnight expenditure. This growth will largely be due to key emerging markets, including China, which is estimated to be the largest economic contributor to Australian tourism by 2020. The number of Chinese visitors has more than doubled from 2006 to 2012 reaching a peak of 626,400 in 2012 and surpassing for the first time the number of arrivals from the United Kingdom. In 2013, China was Australia's fastest growing tourist market. By 2017 China surpassed New Zealand as the top source of visitors to Australia, and in 2019 Chinese visitors reached a peak of over 1.4 million and had contributed about A$12 billion to the Australian economy. According to Tourism Australia Managing Director Andrew McEvoy, the Chinese are the highest spending visitors to the country.

Visas

All visitors to Australia, apart from New Zealanders, require an Australian visa to enter the country. For most countries, a full visa is required. Passport holders of all European Union countries as well as all Schengen Area countries and European microstates can apply online for an eVisitor authorisation. Citizens of some OECD and some East Asian countries can apply for the similar Electronic Travel Authority authorisation.

History

From the colonial days, the idea of travel has been more natural to Australians than to people long-established at one from their homes, was prone to continue their search for wealth or security for a while, or, having settled down, to return to the old countries to visit their kin and refresh old memories. The opening of new lands, the establishment of industries and towns, and the consequent dispersal of people over Australia created a habit of mobility and enterprise which encouraged Australians to face the hardships of early travel by coach, on horseback or by ship. Even so, the slow and uncomfortable modes of travel and the vast distances separating Australian towns tended to restrict travel to essential journeys for purposes of trade, to pursue an occupation or to settle. This changed somewhat with the advent of rail travel.

The initial emphasis in tourism for purposes of pleasure was strongest on travel to resorts near the main population centres. These included the Blue Mountains in New South Wales and the hill and coast resorts close to Melbourne and other major Victorian cities. The existing railway services radiating from those cities, together with the 'feeder' horse-drawn, and later motor, coach transport connecting with the railways, rendered the State Government railway tourist bureaux the main means for selling intrastate, and even some interstate, travel.

Travel for all purposes increased steadily after the Second World War. This period saw the establishment of the Australian National Travel Association with bureaux in the UK and USA. The organisation received government funding on top of industry contributions and promoted the country 'vigorously' via a poster campaign, and from 1934–1974 via Walkabout magazine. From August 1946, Walkabout also doubled as the official journal of the newly formed Australian Geographical Society (AGS), founded with a £5,000 grant from ANTA, its banner subscript reading 'Journal of the Australian Geographical Society. This role is now filled by Australian Geographic magazine.  Later it became ‘Australia's Way of Life Magazine’ when supported by the Australian National Publicity Association and later the Australian Tourist Commission.

Tourism traffic continued to be mainly by rail, but also by sea, although the family motor era began in the 1930s to participate in the shorter intrastate traffic. A considerable fleet of passenger ships provided frequent and popular services linking most ports between Fremantle and Cairns. Other services linked Sydney and Melbourne with Tasmanian ports. The winter cruise of those days to Queensland ports could be regarded as the equivalent of today's drive or flight north for a winter holiday at the Gold Coast or a Barrier Reef Island, or today's shorter South Pacific cruises. The first cruises from Australia to New Zealand were organised in the summer of 1934–35, and Australians were travelling to Britain for as low as $78 in tourist class in the years immediately preceding the Second World War.

In the period following the Second World War the advent of new and improved methods of transportation, combined with rising standards of living and the energetic publicising of foreign destinations, developed international travel into a mass movement. New ocean liners shortened travelling time considerably, and travel by car and bus increased in many countries. Most of all, air travel became widely available, faster, safer, and cheaper. The beginning of the Jet Age in 1960, with larger aeroplanes carrying more than 100 passengers at speeds approximating 600 miles per hour, diminished the world by half in terms of time. Rising standards of living in the post-war period led to greater expenditure on tourism, thus making it more important to the national economy.

Australia has shared in this worldwide expansion of travel, particularly in respect of its domestic tourism. Because of the marked increase in incomes and private car ownership among large sections of the population, greater leisure time, three weeks of paid annual holidays (introduced first in New South Wales in 1958) and the introduction of long-service leave, thousands of Australians now travel by road into almost every part of the country. This has led to investment in the development of new and improved facilities, especially accommodation, of new resorts at dispersed points around Australia, and modifications in organisation and methods of tourist administration, development and promotion. These activities, in turn, have had an important influence on matters such as the improvement of highways and the opening up of national parks and foreshores.

A White Paper was produced analysing the tourist industry in Australia in 2003. A Tourism 2020 strategy was produced and implemented.

Prior to the COVID-19 and 5 major variants, domestic tourism was and continues to be a significant part of the tourism industry, representing 73% of the total direct tourism GDP and has taken on an even greater role. However, in 2021 during the pandemic, Australians travelled intrastate and also interstate when borders were open. From November 2021, borders for Australia were opened and fully vaccinated Australians were permitted to fly overseas without exemption, although the range of countries was added to Malaysia, Singapore, New Zealand and other countries in December with citizens from Japan and South Korea allowed to enter the country, from 1 December 2021.
Following the significant consultation on the replacement Tourism 2030 strategy, its launch was interrupted by COVID-19 leading to the Government Commissioning an Expert Panel led by the former Tourism Minister Martin Ferguson to provide recommendations.

Eventually, the updated Tourism 2030 document titled THRIVE (THe Re-Imagined Visitor Economy) 2030 strategy  is currently being finalised.

Organizations
The Australian Trade and Investment Commission has tourism policy and programs responsibility in the Australian Government with Tourism Australia responsible for marketing Australia. State and territory government jurisdictions have tourism policy departments and/or tourism marketing authorities along with regional tourism organisations. The industry has a wide range of stakeholder bodies including the Australian Tourism Industry Council (ATIC), which includes promotion of the Australian Tourism Accreditation Program, the Australian Tourism Awards and Star Ratings Australia; the Australian Chamber of Commerce and Industry Tourism Chamber, and the Australian Tourism Export Council (ATEC).

Marketing

Australia's international tourism campaigns have focused on Australia's laid back style, such as the 1980s advertising campaign featuring actor Paul Hogan telling American tourists "I'll slip an extra shrimp on the barbie for you", or its cheeky side, as in its controversial 2006 campaign in the United Kingdom using the Australian colloquialism slogan "So where the bloody hell are you?".

Tourism Australia's "No Leave No Life" campaign was launched in March 2009 by the Federal Minister for Tourism, the Hon. Martin Ferguson AM MP. This campaign was designed to remind employees of the personal and professional benefits of taking annual leave, and of taking that leave in Australia. On 30 June 2009, there were 126 million days of stockpiled annual leave in the Australian economy. At the end of the June 2010 quarter, this number had decreased to 117 million days, following falls in the preceding three quarters.

Tourism Australia's consumer campaign "There's Nothing Like Australia" invited Australians to share their favourite Australian place or experience with the world. The campaign is based on research conducted by Tourism Australia that showed Australians were eager to get involved in promoting their country. It was developed to involve Australians because they are the experts on what makes Australia unlike anywhere else. The core message, that "There's Nothing Like Australia" was designed for longevity through different mediums, audiences and activities.

Types of tourists

Tourists by country

International tourists

In 2019, the majority of international visitors to Australia were from China, New Zealand, the United States and the UK, with visitors from China and the United States growing substantially from the early 2000s. 

Growth in tourism in 2019 was led by education and holiday travel. Education visitors were up 5% to 586,000, with spending increasing by 8% to a record $12.7 billion. Holiday visitors were up 4% to almost 4 million, with spending growing by 6% to $16.9 billion.

Backpackers
Australia is popular for people engaging in backpacker tourism, mostly young people from Canada, Hong Kong, Japan, South Korea, United States and Western European countries (particularly the UK, Ireland, France, Netherlands, Germany, Belgium, Italy, Austria, Switzerland and the Nordic countries). Spending more time in Australia, these travellers tend to explore considerably more of the country. Many backpackers participate in working holidays enabling them to stay longer in the country. Working holiday visas for Australia are available for those aged 18 to 30 for most citizens from Western Europe, Canada, the United States, and some developed East Asian nations such as Hong Kong, Taiwan, Japan and South Korea.

Domestic tourism
The domestic tourism market is estimated at $63 billion.  In 2009, the Australian domestic market experienced a 10% slump in the number of visitor nights. Domestic tourism in general and in particular free caravan and camping sites for overnight accommodation experienced strong demand in 2012.

Australians are big domestic travellers, with a profusion of seaside resort towns in every state (many located on or near good surfing beaches), mountain retreats, plentiful national parks, rivers, fishing locations, wine growing regions, as well as domestic visitation of the major tourist spots.  Domestic tourism peaks during the Australian school holidays.

In 2011, a leading Australian travel agent warned that low-cost carriers such as AirAsia and Jetstar who offered cheap packages to Asia threatened the domestic tourism market.

Markets

Major attractions

Destinations
Hervey Bay is a popular tourist town with ample opportunities for whale watching, although there are plenty of other places along the Australian coastline to see whales.

Fraser Island is considered to be the largest sand island in the world at 1840 km2. It is also Queensland's largest island and has been inhabited by humans for as much as 5,000 years. The island has rainforests, eucalyptus woodland, mangrove forests, wallum and peat swamps, sand dunes and coastal heaths. The island can be reached by a ferry from River Heads (South of Hervey Bay) to Kingfisher Bay and Wanggoolba Creek or Inskip Point to the north of Rainbow Beach to Hook Point, or by chartered flight from Maroochydore Airport.

Great Barrier Reef

The Great Barrier Reef attracts up to two million visitors every year. Careful management, which includes permits for camping and all commercial marine tourism within the Great Barrier Reef Marine Park, has so far ensured that tourists have a very minimal impact on the reef. Uluru, Kakadu National Park and Fraser Island are major natural attractions. Uluru won the 2013 Qantas Australian Tourism Awards and was named Australia's best major tourist attraction.

In December 2013, Greg Hunt, the Australian environment minister, approved a plan for dredging to create three shipping terminals as part of the construction of a coal port. According to corresponding approval documents, the process will create around 3 million cubic metres of dredged seabed that will be dumped within the Great Barrier Reef marine park area.

Sydney Opera House
Another attraction that appeals to many tourists is the Sydney Opera House.  Shopping and casinos are a major drawcard for wealthy Chinese visitors.  Wine, indigenous culture and nature tourism also generate travel in Australia.

Events
Major events attract a large number of tourists. The Sydney Gay and Lesbian Mardi Gras is an annual event that attractions thousands of international tourists.

The 2000 Sydney Olympics resulted in significant inbound and domestic tourism to Sydney. During the games, Sydney hosted 362,000 domestic and 110,000 international visitors. In addition, up to 4 billion people watched the games worldwide. The 2003 Rugby World Cup attracted 65,000 international visitors to Australia. Schoolies Week is an annual celebration of Year 12 school leavers in late November, many of whom travel to the Gold Coast, where in 2011 they were expected to boost the economy by $60 million.

Australia's icons

Major Australian icons for tourists to visit include:

See also

 Visa policy of Australia
 List of World Heritage Sites in Australia
 Tourism in Sydney
 Tourism in Melbourne
 Tourism in Brisbane
 Tourism in Queensland 
 Tourism in Perth
 Passenger Movement Charge
 Australian National Travel Association

References

External links

 Information About Australian Holidays & Travel 
 Tourism Australia
 Tourism Research Australia
 Department of Home Affairs
 Austrade - Tourism

 
Australia